Itha is an alternate spelling of the Gaelic feminine given name Íte or Íde.

It may refer to:

 Saint Íte of Killeedy
 918 Itha